Supermarket is a four-issue comic book mini-series written by Brian Wood and illustrated by Kristian Donaldson. It was published by IDW Publishing in 2006.

Story
In the future world of Supermarket, "Cash Rules Everything Around Me" is the literal truth. Legitimate and black-market economies rule the City, overseen by the vying factions of the Yakuza and Porno Swede crime families. Convenience store clerk and 16-year-old suburban wise-ass Pella Suzuki suddenly finds herself in the middle of it all, heir to an empire she could not possibly inherit, but hitmen on both sides are not taking any chances. Supermarket is anti-consumerism with some violence and humor.

Issues
 Released February 2006.
 Released March 22, 2006.
 Released May or June 2006.
 Released September 2006.
The series was reprinted in the March 2014 collection Mean Streets.

External links
Brianwood.com
PRODIGALNINE: Official website for Kristian Donaldson
IDW Publishing

2006 comics debuts
IDW Publishing titles